Deborah Jones Merritt is an American legal scholar.

Merritt earned a bachelor of arts degree in history at Harvard College in 1977, and subsequently graduated from Columbia Law School in 1980. She is the John Deaver Drinko–Baker & Hostetler Chair in Law at the Ohio State University Moritz College of Law. The Deborah Jones Merritt Center for the Advancement of Justice is named for her.

References

21st-century American non-fiction writers
20th-century American non-fiction writers
20th-century American women writers
21st-century American women writers
American women legal scholars
American legal scholars
Moritz College of Law faculty
Columbia Law School alumni
Harvard College alumni
Living people
Year of birth missing (living people)